
Wołomin County is a territorial and administrative division in Masovian Voivodeship, east-central Poland. It came into being on January 1, 1999, as a result of the Polish local government reforms passed in 1998.

As of 2019 its total population is 247,288, out of which the population of Wołomin is 37,082, that of Ząbki is 37,219, that of Marki is 34,679, that of Kobyłka is 24,096, that of Zielonka is 17,588, that of Radzymin is 13,005, that of Tłuszcz is 8,156, and the rural population is 75,463.

Neighbouring counties
Wołomin County is bordered by Wyszków County to the north, Węgrów County to the east, Mińsk County to the south-east, the city of Warsaw to the south-west and Legionowo County to the west.

Administrative division
The county is subdivided into 12 gminas (four urban, three urban-rural and five rural). These are listed in the following table, in descending order of population.

References

 
Land counties of Masovian Voivodeship